The 1960 Canada Cup took place 23–26 June at Portmarnock Golf Club in Portmarnock, north-east of Dublin, Ireland. It was the eighth Canada Cup event, which became the World Cup in 1967. The tournament was a 72-hole stroke play team event with 30 teams. These were the same teams that had competed in 1959 but without South Korea and Indonesia and with the addition of Peru and Central Africa. Each team consisted of two players from a country. The combined score of each team determined the team results. The American team of Arnold Palmer and Sam Snead won by eight strokes over the English team of Bernard Hunt and Harry Weetman. The individual competition was won by the Belgian Flory Van Donck, who finished two shots ahead of Sam Snead.

Teams

Source

Scores
Team

Source

International Trophy

Source

References

World Cup (men's golf)
Golf tournaments in the Republic of Ireland
Golf in County Dublin
Canada Cup
Canada Cup
Canada Cup